Drake Jackson (born April 12, 2001) is an American football defensive end for the San Francisco 49ers of the National Football League (NFL). He played college football at USC.

Early years
Jackson attended Centennial High School in Corona, California. As a senior, he was The Press-Enterprise Defensive Player of the Year after recording 50 tackles and eight sacks. Jackson committed to the University of Southern California (USC) to play college football.

College career
Jackson started as a true freshman, recording 46 tackles and 5.5 sacks in 11 games in 2019.

Professional career

Jackson was drafted in the second round with the 61st overall pick in the 2022 NFL Draft. In Week 3, against the Denver Broncos, he recorded his first NFL sack.

References

External links
 San Francisco 49ers bio
 USC Trojans bio

2001 births
Living people
Sportspeople from Corona, California
Players of American football from California
American football defensive ends
USC Trojans football players
San Francisco 49ers players